The 2020 Northern Irish Women's Premiership was the 17th season of the top-tier women's football league in Northern Ireland. Linfield were the defending champions.

Glentoran won the league for the eighth time.

Teams and locations
The following teams make up the 2020 season.

Teams are listed in alphabetical order.

League table

Results

References 

2020 in women's association football
Women's Premiership (Northern Ireland)